Thereus lomalarga is a species of butterfly of the family Lycaenidae. It is found from Costa Rica to the western slope of the Andes in Ecuador. It occurs in the great variety of forested habitats.

The larvae feed on Oryctanthus alveolatus.

Etymology
The species is named for Loma Larga, a housing development on the outskirts of Parque Nacional Natural Farallones de Cali.

References

Butterflies described in 2015
Thereus